Prasasti Seni is the twelfth studio album from Malaysian pop singer-songwriter Siti Nurhaliza. The album was released on 12 April 2004 in Malaysia, Singapore and Brunei and at a later time in Indonesia on 23 May 2004. This album also includes a heart-shaped VCD that features a video message from Siti and a video clip of "Pejam Matamu". Notable singles include "Dialah Di Hati", which is also nominated in Best Song category in Anugerah Industri Muzik, "Lagu Rindu" & "Seindah Biasa".

Production
Prasasti Seni was heavily influenced by Siti Nurhaliza. Prasasti, a Malay loanword from Sanskrit carries the meaning of "stone inscription" or "a marker signifying existence". She explained the rationale on chosen the title as, "Songs that are sung by me are my marks of existence in the local music scene. The title of the album is very significant to me in divulging what I have kept in my heart for my beloved fans."{{efn|Original:"Lagu-lagu nyanyian Siti merupakan tanda kewujudan Siti dalam arena seni tanah air. Judul album berkenaan signifikan sekali untuk Siti meluahkan apa yang tersurat di hati Siti buat peminat-peminat tercinta."}}

Artwork
The album cover photography was designed by Rauna Jud and filmed in Janda Baik, Pahang. The cover depicts Siti Nurhaliza styling a white gown. It was also nominated for the Best Album Cover at the 2005 Anugerah Industri Muzik.

Release and receptionPrasasti Seni was released on 12 April 2004 in Malaysia, Singapore and Brunei and later in Indonesia on 23 May 2004. To promote the album, "Seindah Biasa" was released as the first single in the album. This was later followed by "Dialah di Hati" (second single), "Lagu Rindu" (third single) and "Pendirianku" (fourth single). The album was well-received by fans as more than 100,000 units and 700,000 units were sold in both Malaysian and Indonesian markets respectively.

Critical responsePrasasti Seni was well-received by music critics. Many of the critics reviewed her vocals in the album favourably. Faridul Anwar Farinordin of New Straits Times gave the album three and half stars. He praised the new direction of the album as "fresh" and "more adult contemporary". Echoing similar points made by Faridul, Jad Mahidin of Sunday Mail also agreed that Siti has matured musically and gave the album a four-star review. In a glowing review by Meor Shariman of The Malay Mail, he praised the album as one of her best, commending it as "better than her award-winning E.M.A.S". Reviewer from Harian Metro'' also reviewed the album as a better album than its predecessor and praised Siti for venturing into fresher new sounds.

Track listing

Awards

Explanatory notes

References

External links
 Prasasti Seni on iTunes

2004 albums
Siti Nurhaliza albums
Suria Records albums
Malay-language albums
Siti Nurhaliza video albums